Andrzej Bachleda-Curuś III (born 1 January 1975 in Zakopane) is a Polish former alpine skier who competed in the 1998 Winter Olympics and 2002 Winter Olympics.

External links
 sports-reference.com
 

1975 births
Living people
Polish male alpine skiers
Olympic alpine skiers of Poland
Alpine skiers at the 1998 Winter Olympics
Alpine skiers at the 2002 Winter Olympics
Sportspeople from Zakopane
20th-century Polish people